The World Solo Drumming Championships is an annual event organized by the Royal Scottish Pipe Band Association, and sponsored (since 2000) by Andante Drums & Percussion. First prize in the Adult division is considered the top individual award obtainable in competitive pipe band snare drumming.

History
Little is known of the event prior to 1947, although the book "One Hundred Years of Pipe Band Drumming" (Young & Chatto) mentions Charlie Davis winning the "SPBA Individual Solo Drumming Championships" in 1937.

No event was held in 1999 due to a lack of sponsorship.

Jim Kilpatrick has been most successful over the years, being named World Champion a record 16 times. The current title holder is Steven McWhirter of Inveraray & District Pipe Band.

List of winners

References

External links
 

Folk festivals in Scotland